is a national highway of Japan that connects the capital cities of Iwate Prefecture and Akita Prefecture, Morioka and Akita.

Route description

National Route 46 is one of the primary east-west highways in the prefectures of Akita and Iwate and the main route between the cities of Morioka in the Iwate Prefecture's interior plains and the city of Akita on the Sea of Japan coast. It carries traffic across the Ōu Mountains that separate the two cities. The highway's eastern terminus lies at a junction with National Route 4 southeast of central Morioka. It has significant concurrencies with National Route 13 and National Route 341. A section of the highway is built to expressway standards in the city of Semboku. The highway along with National Route 13, meets its western terminus at a junction with National Route 7 to the west of central Akita.

History
National Route 46 was originally designated on 18 May 1953 as National Route 105, and this was redesignated as National Route 46 when the route was promoted to a primary national highway. The highway was completed in December 1975, but the road over the Ōu Mountains was deemed to be insufficient.

Major intersections
All junctions listed are at-grade intersections unless noted otherwise.

See also

References

External links

046
Roads in Akita Prefecture
Roads in Iwate Prefecture